Luis Eduardo Rodríguez Chávez (born September 14, 1991, in Saltillo, Coahuila) is a Mexican professional footballer who plays for Yalmakán on loan from Atlante.

External links

 

Living people
1991 births
Association football forwards
Atlante F.C. footballers
Tlaxcala F.C. players
Yalmakán F.C. footballers
Liga MX players
Ascenso MX players
Liga Premier de México players
Sportspeople from Saltillo
Footballers from Coahuila
Mexican footballers